Draper was originally a term for a retailer or wholesaler of cloth that was mainly for clothing. A draper may additionally operate as a cloth merchant or a haberdasher.

History
Drapers were an important trade guild during the medieval period, when the sellers of cloth operated out of drapers' shops. However the original meaning of the term has now largely fallen out of use.

In 1724, Jonathan Swift wrote a series of satirical pamphlets in the guise of a draper called the Drapier's Letters.

Historical drapers
 
A number of notable people who have at one time or another worked as drapers include:
 Sir Thomas Adams, 1st Baronet (1586-1667/1668), Lord Mayor of the City of London
 William Barley (1565?-1614), bookseller and publisher
 Norman Birkett
 Margaret Bondfield
 Thomas Burberry, Founder of fashion brand "Burberry"
 Eleanor Coade (1733–1821), successful businesswoman with Coade stone
 John Graunt, founder of the science of demography
 Antonie van Leeuwenhoek
 John Spedan Lewis
 Anthony Munday
 Harry S. Truman, haberdasher before he became a Senator, Vice President and President of the United States.
 H. G. Wells and his fictional characters Kipps and Mr Polly were draper's assistants 
 Edward Whalley, regicide, cousin of Oliver Cromwell
 George Williams, founder of the YMCA
 John Woodward, geologist and physician to King Charles II
 William McGregor, 1846 - 1911.  Founder of the Football League.  First Chairman of Aston Villa.

Current usage
A draper is now defined as a highly skilled role within the fashion industry. The term is used within a fashion design or costume design studio for people tasked with creating garments or patterns by draping fabric over a dress form; draping uses a human form to physically position the cloth into a desired pattern. This is an alternative method to drafting, when the garment is initially worked out from measurements on paper.

A fashion draper may also be known as a "first hand" because they are often the most skilled creator in the workshop and the "first" to work with the cloth for a garment. However a first hand in a costume studio is often an assistant to the draper. They are responsible for cutting the fabric with the patterns and assisting in costume fittings.

See also
Draper – a surname taken from the occupation
Drapery
Kraków Cloth Hall – Renaissance landmark of Kraków, Poland
Millinery
Worshipful Company of Drapers, the London guild

References

 
Sales occupations
Clothing industry